Chet Baker in Europe (subtitled A Jazz Tour of the NATO Countries) is an album by jazz trumpeter Chet Baker drawn from sessions recorded in Paris in 1955 for Barclay Records and released in the U.S. on the Pacific Jazz label. One consists largely of compositions by Bob Zieff, which pianist Dick Twardzik had introduced to Baker's repertoire; the other side consists of standards, recorded with a different quartet after Twardzik's death from a heroin overdose.

Reception

Allmusic rated the album with 3 stars.

Track listing
 "Summertime" (DuBose Heyward, George Gershwin, Ira Gershwin) - 4:16   
 "You Go to My Head" (Haven Gillespie, J. Fred Coots) - 5:54   
 "Tenderly" (Jack Lawrence, Walter Gross) - 6:39   
 "Autumn in New York" (Vernon Duke) - 7:06   
 "There's a Small Hotel" (Lorenz Hart, Richard Rodgers) - 3:48   
 "Rondette" (Bob Zieff) - 2:11   
 "Piece Caprice" (Zieff) - 5:12   
 "Mid-Forte" (Zieff) - 3:08   
 "Pomp" (Zieff) - 4:42   
 "Sad Walk" (Zieff) - 4:14   
 "The Girl from Greenland" (Richard Twardzik) - 5:16  
Recorded in Paris, France, on October 11 (tracks 6, 8, 10), October 14 (tracks 7, 9, 11), and October 24 (tracks 1-5), 1955

Personnel
Chet Baker - trumpet
Dick Twardzik (tracks 6-11), Gérard Gustin (tracks 1-5) - piano
Jimmy Bond - bass
Nils-Bertil Dahlander (tracks 1-5), Peter Littman (tracks 6-11) - drums

References 

1956 albums
Chet Baker albums
Pacific Jazz Records albums